The presence of Senegaleses in Italy dates back to the 1980s.

Numbers
In 2014 in Italy there are 94,030 regular immigrants from Senegal. In 2006 there were 59,857. The three cities with most number of Senegaleses are: Milan, Rome and Genoa.

Notable Senegaleses in Italy

Notable Senegalese people based in Italy or Italian-born with Senegalese heritage:
Aminata Aidara, journalist, short story writer and novelist
Cheikh Tidiane Gaye, novelist
Jenny B, singer
Edrissa Sanneh, former DJ and sports journalist
Abramo Canka, professional basketball player
Valentina Diouf, professional volleyball player
Davide Diaw, professional football player
Alfred Gomis, professional footballer 
Kalidou Koulibaly, footballer
Lys Gomis, footballer
Mamadou Coulibaly, footballer
Maurice Gomis, footballer
Mouhamed Ali Ndiaye, professional boxer
Cher Ndour, footballer
Welle Ossou, footballer
Khaby Lame, social media personality

See also

 Nigerian people in Italy

References

Notes

African diaspora in Italy
Ethnic groups in Italy
Muslim communities in Europe